Lesina Cathedral is a Roman Catholic church and former cathedral dedicated to the Annunciation of the Virgin Mary located in Lesina, in the region of Apulia, Italy.

There was a church on this site from c. 600 which served as the cathedral of the former Diocese of Lesina until it was suppressed in favour of the Diocese of Larino in 1567. Rebuilt over the centuries, the building was destroyed by an earthquake in 1630. By the 1650s, another church had been built, dedicated to the Annunciation and consecrated in 1691, which was replaced in its turn in 1828–1837. In 1922 the roof fell in, and was not rebuilt until the 1950s.

The church has a single nave with two side chapels. The interior has frescoes depicting the Life of Christ by Bocchetti Gaetano.

References

Former cathedrals in Italy
19th-century Roman Catholic church buildings in Italy
Roman Catholic churches completed in 1837
Churches in the province of Foggia